Crooked Mile or A Crooked Mile or The Crooked Mile may refer to:

Nursery rhyme
"There Was a Crooked Man who walked a crooked mile"

Arts and entertainment
 The Crooked Mile (musical), a 1959 musical and soundtrack
 The Crooked Mile, a children's film written and directed by Stephen Kane and Joe McKinney
 A Crooked Mile, episode 3 of The Wolf Among Us
The Crooked Mile, a series of 1989 comics by Philip Bond
The Crooked Mile, a 1924 novel by Bernard DeVoto
Crooked Mile, a 1987 album by Microdisney
 "Crooked Mile", a song by Baroness from the 2019 album Gold & Grey

Other
 The nickname for a section on the B194 road passing through Fishers Green north of Waltham Abbey, Essex, England